Tennessee's 5th Senate district is one of 33 districts in the Tennessee Senate. It has been represented by Republican Randy McNally, the current Lieutenant Governor of Tennessee, since 1987.

Geography
District 5 covers all of Anderson and Loudon Counties and part of Knox County in the Knoxville metropolitan area, including some of Knoxville proper as well as the surrounding communities of Clinton, Lenoir City, Loudon, Tellico Village, Oliver Springs, and northern Oak Ridge.

The district is split between Tennessee's 2nd and 3rd congressional districts, and overlaps with the 13th, 15th, 16th, 19th, 21st, 32nd, 33rd, 36th, and 89th districts of the Tennessee House of Representatives.

Recent election results
Tennessee Senators are elected to staggered four-year terms, with odd-numbered districts holding elections in midterm years and even-numbered districts holding elections in presidential years.

2018

2014

Federal and statewide results in District 5

References 

5
Anderson County, Tennessee
Knox County, Tennessee
Loudon County, Tennessee